The 2022 Maryland Bobcats FC season is the club's seventh season of existence, and their third in the National Independent Soccer Association (NISA), the third tier of American soccer. The Bobcats' season began on March 26, 2022, and will conclude on October 10, 2022.

Competitions

NISA

Standings

Results summary

Match results

U.S. Open Cup

NISA Independent Cup

References

External links 
 Flower City Union

2022 National Independent Soccer Association season
American soccer clubs 2022 season
2022 in sports in Maryland